Lake Macdonald is a rural locality in the Shire of Noosa, Queensland, Australia. In the  Lake Macdonald had a population of 1,363 people.

Geography 
Located adjacent to the suburb is the Six Mile Creek Dam, a rock and earth-fill embankment dam across the Six Mile Creek that impounds the reservoir, called Lake Macdonald. The main purpose of the reservoir is for potable water supply of the Sunshine Coast region and for recreation.

History 
Between 2008 and 2013 Lake Macdonald (along with the rest of Shire of Noosa) was within the Sunshine Coast Region.

At the  Lake Macdonald had a population of 1129 people.

In the  Lake Macdonald had a population of 1,363 people.

Education
There are no schools in Lake Macdonald. The nearest primary school is Cooroy State School in neighbouring Cooroy to the south-east. The nearest secondary school is Noosa District State High School which has its junior campus (Years 7–9) in neighbouring Pomona to the north-east and its senior campus (Years 10–12) in Cooroy.

Facilities
Lake Macdonald Water Treatment Plant is on Lake Macdonald Drive.

There are a number of facilities around the lake There is a boat ramp and pontoon at Mary River Cod Park in Collwood Road for access to the lake. There is another boat ramp at Lake MacDonald Park, Lake MacDonald Drive. They are all managed by the South East Queensland Water Corp.

There are two jetties into the lake, one at the north of the lake at Lake MacDonald Drive and one at the south of the lake. Both are managed by the Noosa Shire Council.

References

External links

 

Suburbs of Noosa Shire, Queensland
Localities in Queensland